Heliozela biprominens is a moth of the family Heliozelidae. It was described by Lee, Hirowatari and Kuroko in 2006 and is endemic to Japan (Honshu).

The forewings are pale greyish ochreous with brassy reflections. The hindwings are pale grey with brassy reflections.

References

External links

Moths described in 2006
Endemic fauna of Japan
Heliozelidae
Moths of Japan